On October 24, 2022, a mass shooting occurred at Central Visual and Performing Arts High School in the Southwest Garden section of St. Louis, Missouri, United States. Three people were killed, including the perpetrator, and an additional seven were injured. Authorities identified 19-year-old former student Orlando Harris as the perpetrator.

Background 
Central Visual and Performing Arts High School uses the code word "Miles Davis is in the building" to alert students and staff of an active shooter in the building. The school also has several metal detectors, and seven security guards were present on the day of the shooting.

Missouri does not have a red flag law which permits a state court to order the temporary removal of firearms from a person who they believe may present a danger to others or themselves.

Shooting  
On October 24, 2022, shortly before the incident, Harris parked his blue 2012 Dodge Avenger near the building before entering the school via a side entryway, walking up to the third floor. Harris was armed with an AR-15 style rifle, more than 600 rounds of ammunition, and about a dozen 30-round magazines. Wearing all black clothing, Harris forcibly made entry by shooting a glass door before opening fire inside the school on the fourth floor. At 9:11 a.m., police received the first call regarding an active shooter threat at the school. School security officers were credited with identifying Harris's intentions and warning others to allow for authorities to be notified. 

One witness said Harris shot the windows of his classroom out, then shouted "You're all going to fucking die" before he attempted to enter their room. At one point, Harris entered a dance class intent on opening fire, but his firearm malfunctioned, allowing occupants to escape. Evacuating students and staff were questioned by responding officers to pinpoint where Harris was located and also followed the sounds of gunfire. Police entered the building at 9:15 a.m., ordered Harris to put his hands up, and subsequently exchanged gunfire with him eight minutes later. After a brief shootout, at 9:25 a.m., Harris was struck and killed. No officers were injured.

During the shooting, students attending Collegiate School of Medicine and Bioscience, which shares the building with Central Visual and Performing Arts High School, were placed under lockdown. Students were evacuated to the nearby Gateway STEM High School.

Victims 
Two people were killed by the gunman: 15-year-old sophomore Alexzandria Bell, who was pronounced dead on the scene, and 61-year-old physical education teacher Jean Kuczka, who died at a hospital. In addition to the fatalities, seven people were injured, four from gunshots and three from physical injuries caused by the ensuing chaos and evacuation. One injured victim was shot twice and jumped out a second-story window, breaking his ankle.

Investigation 
St. Louis police and federal authorities from the FBI and ATF worked together to search both the school, home and car of the perpetrator to identify a motive. The FBI created a digital evidence collection website where they have asked anyone with photos, video, audio or any other evidence to upload it to aid in the investigation.

After the incident, Harris was described by some who knew him in school as often lonely or quiet, but students in his drama classes said he was outgoing and friendly. Harris left a note inside of his car containing a list of school shootings, school shooters, and death tolls of the incidents. In the note, he stated that he wanted to be the “next national school shooter.” He wrote: “I don’t have any friends, I don’t have any family, I’ve never had a girlfriend, I’ve never had a social life. I’ve been an isolated loner my entire life. This was the perfect storm of a mass shooter.” A map of the school was also found in the car, showing the attack had been planned.

Perpetrator 
The perpetrator was identified by authorities as Orlando Harris, a  19-year-old male, of Carondelet, St. Louis. Harris had graduated from the school a year prior and had no adult criminal record. Harris struggled with mental health issues. Harris' family sought mental health treatment for Harris and had at times committed Harris to a mental institution.

On October 8, 2022, Harris attempted to purchase a weapon from a licensed dealer in St. Charles, Missouri, but was denied because of a failed FBI background check. Harris then purchased the AR-15 style rifle used in the shooting from a private individual. No law prevented the private sale.

On October 15, Harris' mother called 9-1-1 to report that Harris had the rifle and requested that police remove the rifle. Responding police determined Harris was lawfully allowed to possess the rifle. Police confiscated the rifle from Harris and handed it to an adult who was lawfully permitted to carry it.

Reactions 
The White House called it "another school shooting," stated "our hearts go out to everyone impacted by this senseless violence," and renewed calls for an assault weapons ban. President Joe Biden posted on Twitter, writing "Jill and I are thinking of everyone impacted by the senseless shooting in St. Louis – especially those killed and injured, their families, and the first responders. As we mourn with Central Visual and Performing Arts, we must take action – starting by banning assault weapons." United States Secretary of Education Miguel Cardona condemned the shooting, calling it a "senseless act of violence".

St. Louis Mayor Tishaura Jones called the event "a devastating and traumatic situation", tweeting "Help us Jesus" following the shooting. On October 27, the area held a Gun Violence and School Safety town hall at the St. Louis Community College which was hosted by Representative Cori Bush, St. Louis Mayor Tishaura Jones and St. Louis Public Safety Director Daniel Isom, with some participation seen by Congressman Jamaal Bowman who serves as Vice Chair on the U.S. House Committee on Education and Labor. 

The St. Louis Blues would hold two moments of silence, the first being in Winnipeg during their game against the Winnipeg Jets, and the second one during their home game against the Edmonton Oilers. As a result of the shooting, the school along with Collegiate School of Medicine and Bioscience had been closed for a week.

The editorial board of The Washington Post wrote that Missouri is "notorious for having some of the weakest gun laws in the nation" and asked, "How many more school shootings need to happen before Missouri wakes up? How many more before Congress enacts a national assault weapons ban and requires universal background checks?" An opinion piece at the Philadelphia Inquirer contrasted law enforcement responses to this shooting, with that of Robb Elementary School shooting in Uvalde, Texas, the latter having widely been perceived as inept.

See also 
 List of mass shootings in the United States in 2022
 2022 Oakland school shooting

References 

2022 active shooter incidents in the United States
2022 in Missouri
2022 mass shootings in the United States
2022 murders in the United States
Crime in St. Louis
Deaths by firearm in Missouri
High school shootings in the United States
Mass shootings in the United States
October 2022 crimes in the United States
Mass shootings in Missouri